Lourteigia is a genus of South American flowering plants in the tribe Eupatorieae within the family Asteraceae.

The genus name of Lourteigia is in honour of Alicia Lourteig (1913–2003), an Argentine and French botanist, who was a world specialist in Oxalidaceae plants. It was first described and published in Phytologia Vol.21 on page 28 in 1971.

 Species

References

Eupatorieae
Flora of South America
Asteraceae genera
Plants described in 1971